Vangaveeti may refer to:

Vangaveeti Mohana Ranga (1948–1988), Indian politician
Vangaveeti (film), a 2016 Indian film

Indian surnames